is a 1954 Japanese drama film directed by Mitsuo Wakasugi.

Cast
 Isuzu Yamada
 Kenji Susukida
 Tsutomu Shimomoto
 Michiko Saga

References

Japanese black-and-white films
1954 films
1950s Japanese films